Frank Lee Beard (born June 11, 1949) is an American drummer best known as a member of the rock band ZZ Top.

Early life 
Beard was born in Frankston, Texas, and attended Irving  High School in Irving, Texas.

Career 

Before joining ZZ Top, Beard was a member of a fake version of the British band the Zombies, which toured in the US without authorization from the original band members, and also was part of the Outlaws with later ZZ Top member Dusty Hill. Other bands Beard and Hill played with early in their careers included the Cellar Dwellers, the Hustlers, the Warlocks, and American Blues.

In May 1969, Beard joined The Moving Sidewalks, a band that would become ZZ Top in July 1969. Beard also introduced Gibbons to Hill. After honing their trademark "Texas boogie-blues-rock" style, they released ZZ Top's First Album on London Records in January 1971. Beard is credited under the nickname "Rube Beard" on the ZZ Top's First Album and on Tres Hombres, the band's third album, but is credited under his actual name on Rio Grande Mud, their second album. He is also credited under his actual name on every ZZ Top album since 1975's Fandango!

After achieving success with ZZ Top in the late 1970s, Beard began spending a lot of money on drugs, including LSD, cocaine and heroin. He later regretted spending the money, and said it damaged his relationships. He joined a rehabilitation program. He recalled: "I just wanted to get sober. I wanted to be like people I admired that could sit home and watch TV and go to bed, and that was okay [for them]." ZZ Top went on hiatus for three years while Beard dealt with his addiction.

Personal life 
Beard married long-time girlfriend Catherine Alexander in April 1978 and divorced July 1981. He married Debbie Meredith in November 1982. They remain married and have three children. Beard resides in Richmond, Texas, where he owns and operates the Top 40 Ranch. He golfs, and is known locally for participation in tournaments and community events. Beard was long known as the only member of ZZ Top not to have a beard, but he grew a short one in 2013.

Endorsements 
Beard plays Tama drums, Paiste cymbals, Promark drumsticks, and Remo drumheads.

References

External links

1949 births
20th-century American drummers
American male drummers
American rock drummers
Blues rock musicians
Living people
People from Anderson County, Texas
People from Richmond, Texas
People from Irving, Texas
Musicians from Texas
ZZ Top members